Joe Samuel Ironside (born 16 October 1993) is an English professional footballer who plays as a striker for  club Cambridge United.

Ironside started his career at Sheffield United after progressing through their academy. He spent time on loan at FC Halifax Town, Harrogate Town, Alfreton Town and Hartlepool United before signing for Alfreton in 2015.

Career

Sheffield United
Ironside came through the academy at Sheffield United. He was in the team that lost the 2011 FA Youth Final against Manchester United, although he scored United's only goal at Old Trafford a 4–1 defeat in the second leg, following a 2–2 draw at Bramall Lane. Ironside made his first-team debut for United on 17 October 2012, appearing as an 89th-minute substitute in a 4–1 away win against Notts County in the Football League Trophy. His first league appearance came on 8 December as an 81st-minute substitute in a 3–1 away win over Carlisle United. After a string of appearances for United, Ironside signed a professional contract of a two and a half years with the club in March 2013.

After making six appearances for United at the start of the 2013–14 season, Ironside joined Conference Premier club FC Halifax Town on 12 November 2013 on loan until 5 January 2014. Ironside made his debut for his new club against Hyde the same day, being named in the starting eleven and scoring a goal which was disallowed as offside, before being substituted after 61 minutes. Ironside returned to United after making 11 appearances for Halifax, only to be loaned out once more in February 2014, this time to Conference North club Harrogate Town on a one-month loan. Ironside's loan was extended until the end of the season after a successful initial spell, but struggled with injuries during the remainder of his loan, and returned to United in May having played eight matches.

Ironside went on trial with Grimsby Town before joining Conference Premier club Alfreton Town on 16 August 2014 on a one-month loan, making his debut the same day, starting in a 2–0 loss away to Forest Green Rovers. Ironside joined League Two club Hartlepool United on 22 November 2014 on a one-month loan. Hartlepool decided not to extend Ironside's loan on 31 December 2014 and he returned to United having scored once in four appearances for Hartlepool.

Non-League
Ironside signed for Conference Premier club Alfreton Town permanently on 15 January 2015 on a one-and-a-half-year contract after being released by Sheffield United. He left Alfreton by mutual consent on 5 February 2016 before signing for their National League North rivals Nuneaton Town three days later.

Ironside signed for National League North club Kidderminster Harriers on 21 March 2017 on a contract until June 2019 for a five-figure fee. He joined Kidderminster's National League North rivals York City on 12 November 2018 on loan until 11 January 2019. He was recalled by Kidderminster on 7 January 2019 having made 10 appearances for York without scoring.

Macclesfield Town
Ironside turned down the offer of a new long-term contract with Kidderminster to sign for League Two club Macclesfield Town on 5 June 2019 on a one-year contract.

Cambridge United
On 1 August 2020, Ironside joined League Two club Cambridge United signing a two-year deal. He joined ex-Norwich City midfielder Wes Hoolahan at the Abbey Stadium who signed earlier that week.

Ironside made his debut for the U's in 1–0 win over Birmingham City in the first round of the EFL Cup. A week later he opened his account in the League Two opener against Carlisle United picking up the ball on the edge of the area before sweeping in a shot into the bottom right hand corner.

Personal life
Ironside was born in Middlesbrough, North Yorkshire. He is the son of Ian Ironside, a former footballer who played as a goalkeeper.

Career statistics

Honours
Sheffield United
FA Youth Cup runner-up: 2010–11

References
England C statistics

Specific

External links
Profile at the Macclesfield Town F.C. website

1993 births
Living people
Footballers from Middlesbrough
English footballers
Association football forwards
Sheffield United F.C. players
FC Halifax Town players
Harrogate Town A.F.C. players
Alfreton Town F.C. players
Hartlepool United F.C. players
Nuneaton Borough F.C. players
Kidderminster Harriers F.C. players
York City F.C. players
Macclesfield Town F.C. players
Cambridge United F.C. players
English Football League players
National League (English football) players